Nairobi railway station is a railway station located in Nairobi, Kenya. The station is on the metre gauge Uganda Railway, and previously provided services to Mombasa three times per week. However, in 2017, the new Mombasa-Nairobi Standard Gauge Railway took over services to Mombasa, starting from a new Nairobi Terminus in Syokimau, 20km from Nairobi CBD.

History

The station was built in 1899 and saw structural additions throughout the 20th century. It is on the site of the first stone building in Nairobi in 1904, which was a Catholic church. That church now meets at the Cathedral Basilica of the Holy Family.

When the railway connection between Kenya and Tanzania closed in 2006, rail services ceased to operate between the two countries. A bus route, however, provides international transport between Nairobi and Arusha, the journey taking approximately five hours.

In 2012, the Kenyan government opened a new metro rail service from Nairobi station to the suburb of Syokimau. Syokimau will get a few trains every day, although there was criticism that a ticket would cost more than the average daily wage.

Museum

In 1971, the East African Railways and Harbours Corporation established the Nairobi Railway Museum to preserve and display the history of rail travel in East Africa. The museum is connected to the main line by rail, allowing steam excursions on restored locomotives.

References

External links

Railway stations in Kenya
Railway stations opened in 1899
Buildings and structures in Nairobi
Transport in Nairobi